The René C. Davidson Courthouse (originally, Alameda County Court House) is a courthouse, part of the Alameda County Superior Court system. The art deco style courthouse was completed in 1934 and is located in the county seat of Oakland, California, USA. It is adjacent to Lake Merritt.

History
The building was built in 1934 on the edge of Lake Merritt, originally housing the entirety of the Alameda County Superior Court system. The old courthouse that it replaced was demolished in 1949. The inscription on the building reads "Alameda County Court House".

In the early 1930s Alameda County District Attorney Earl Warren sought a modern structure to the replace the antiquated 1893 Alameda County Court House at 4th Street and Broadway. The building served as the office of the Clerk-County Recorder from 1934 to the 2000 when replaced by a new building at 1106 Madison Street in Oakland. The name of Rene C. Davidson was placed on the Alameda County Court House after the death of the longtime Recorder. Another name offered, longtime Clerk-Recorder Jack G. Blue, immediate predecessor of Davidson.

In 2016, it was revealed that the FBI hid microphones outside the courthouse, between March 2010 and January 2011, as part of an investigation into bid rigging and fraud by Alameda and San Mateo County real estate investors, this done without a warrant.

Trials
The Chauncey Bailey murder trial was held at the courthouse. Thomas Reardon was the presiding judge in the trial, with Yusuf Bey IV the defendant.

Mythbusters
In an episode aired on 29 October 2008, the Mythbusters used the building to test a jailbreak scenario by having people lower themselves down the facade of the courthouse using ropes made of materials said to be available to inmates: bedsheets, human hair and toilet paper.

References

External links

René C. Davidson Courthouse at the Alameda County Superior Court website

Alameda
Government of Alameda County, California
Government buildings completed in 1934
Skyscraper office buildings in Oakland, California
1934 establishments in California